ISO 20471 is an International Organization for Standardization technical standard describing requirements for high-visibility clothing, along with methods for testing and confirming that clothing meets those requirements.

References 

20471 
Occupational safety and health